Onchidiopsis is a genus of small slug-like sea snails, marine gastropod molluscs in the subfamily Lamellariinae within the family Velutinidae.

Species
Species within the genus Onchidiopsis include: 
Onchidiopsis carnea Bergh, 1853
Onchidiopsis corys Bergh, 1910
Onchidiopsis glacialis (Sars, 1851)
Onchidiopsis groenlandica Bergh, 1853
Onchidiopsis kingmaruensis Russell, 1942
Onchidiopsis spitzbergensis Jensen in Thorson, 1944

Species brought into synonymy:
Onchidiopsis latissima Odhner, 1913 : synonym of Onchidiopsis carnea Bergh, 1853

References 

 Brunel, P., L. Bosse, and G. Lamarche. 1998. Catalogue of the marine invertebrates of the estuary and Gulf of St. Lawrence. Canadian Special Publication of Fisheries and Aquatic Sciences, 126. 405 p
 Gofas, S.; Le Renard, J.; Bouchet, P. (2001). Mollusca, in: Costello, M.J. et al. (Ed.) (2001). European register of marine species: a check-list of the marine species in Europe and a bibliography of guides to their identification. Collection Patrimoines Naturels, 50: pp. 180–213

External links
  Francis N.Balch, On a new Labradorean species of Onchidiopsis, a genus of mollusks new to Eastern North America; with remarks on its relationships; Proceedings of the United States National Museum 38:469-484 (1910)

Velutinidae
Gastropod genera